Vivier is a surname. Notable people with the surname include:

Basie Vivier (1927–2009), South African rugby union footballer
Claude Vivier (1948–1983), Canadian composer of contemporary classical music
Eugène Léon Vivier (1821–1900), French horn player
Jacques Vivier (1930–2021), French professional cyclist
Robert Vivier (1894–1989), Belgian poet and writer
Roger Vivier (1907–1998), French fashion designer who specialized in shoes

See also
Viviers (disambiguation)

French toponymic surnames